Parvaaz: The Journey is a 2021 Indian bilingual drama film directed by Gurbir Singh Grewal, starring Gulshan Grover Kimi Verma, Mandeep Brar, Zoe Fraser, Garry Sanghera & Kirti Arneja in lead roles. The film is based on the father-son relationship and their differences. Grover played the role of a single father.

Cast 

 Gulshan Grover
 Kimi Verma
 Mandeep Brar
 Zoe Fraser
 Garry Sanghera
 Kirti Arneja

Production 
The film was shot at some of the locations of Osoyoos & Oliver.

References

External links 
 
 Parvaaz: The Journey on Twitter
 Parvaaz: The Journey on Rotten Tomatoes

2021 films
2020s Hindi-language films
English-language Indian films
Punjabi-language Indian films
Indian drama films
2020s English-language films
2020s Punjabi-language films
2021 multilingual films
Indian multilingual films